The beste is a vocal genre in Ottoman classical music. It was a movement of the fasıl, or suite.

Beste was one of the main forms of fasil (along with semâ'î), and its lyrics came from the Ottoman Turkish language poetry forms gazel and murabba.

References

External links
Beste page

Turkish music
Turkish words and phrases
Song forms
Forms of Turkish makam music
Forms of Ottoman classical music